State Route 98 (SR 98) is a state highway in Coconino County in the U.S. state of Arizona.

Route description

SR 98 begins at an intersection with US 89 just south of the Glen Canyon Dam along the Colorado River. It runs along the southern portion of the city of Page and turns southeast to the Navajo Nation. It enters the town of Kaibito in the reservation, but otherwise the stretch through the Native American reservation is mostly devoid of settlements. Following Indian Route 22, SR 98 intersects Indian Route 221 just north of its eastern terminus at US 160, the Navajo Trail.

History

The route was established in 1974, when portions of former Indian Route 22 were given to the Arizona Department of Transportation to establish as a state highway, as routed today. Portions of the route were realigned in Page when portions of the route were redefined as State Route 989. This portion in Page was later relinquished by ADOT to the city of Page. Four years later, the rest of the route was designated as a scenic road.

In 2013, due to the buckling of U.S. Route 89 south of Page, the route became one of the major detour routes from the South Rim to the North Rim of the Grand Canyon.

Junction list

References

External links

098
Transportation in Coconino County, Arizona
Transportation in Navajo County, Arizona